Foothills Regional Airport (formerly Morganton-Lenoir Airport)  is a public airport located nine miles south of the City of Lenoir, NC, and eight miles northeast of the City of Morganton, NC. It is owned by the Foothills Regional Airport Authority.

Facilities and Aircraft
The Foothills Regional Airport covers an area of 1,170 acres (473 ha) and contains one grooved asphalt paved runway: 3/21 measuring 5,500 ft × 75 ft (1,676 m × 23 m). For the 12-month period ending August 31, 2005, the airport had 17,000 aircraft operations, an average of 46 per day: 97% general aviation and 3% military. There were 74 aircraft based on the field at that time.

References

Airports in North Carolina
Transportation in Burke County, North Carolina
Buildings and structures in Burke County, North Carolina